Ferdinando Petruccelli della Gattina (August 28, 1815 - March 29, 1890) was an Italian journalist, patriot and politician.

Considered one of the greatest journalists of the 19th century and a pioneer of modern journalism, he is mostly remembered for his war correspondence. He wrote for many Italian papers and contributed to the press in France, Great Britain and Belgium. He was also a prolific novelist, mainly focused on religious themes.

Biography

Youth
Born at Moliterno, Basilicata, at the time part of the Kingdom of Naples, his birth name was Ferdinando Petruccelli and he added "della Gattina" (name of a farm of his own) to his surname in order to avoid the Bourbon police who persecuted him for political reason. His father Luigi was a physician and member of the Carbonari while his mother Maria Antonia Piccininni was a noblewoman from Marsicovetere.

Grown up in religious circles and because of the abuses received as a child, he developed a strong anticlericalism which will be reflected in his works. During his young age, he devoted himself to the study of Latin and Greek. Later, he attended the University of Naples, graduating in medicine but he chose the path of journalism.

Early career and exile
In 1838, he began his career for the Neapolitan newspaper Omnibus and, in 1840, he traveled to France, Great Britain and Germany as a correspondent for Salvator Rosa and Raccoglitore fiorentino. Because of his liberal ideas, he was arrested for his membership in Young Italy and was sent under guard to his native town.

Returned to Naples in 1848, Petruccelli was elected deputy of the Neapolitan parliament and founded Mondo vecchio e mondo nuovo, a newspaper who accused the Bourbon dynasty of misgovernment in both internal and foreign policy and, for the frequent attacks on the crown, it was suppressed by the magistracy. After the suspension of the constitution promulgated by the king Ferdinand II few months before, he took part in the riots of the same year. The revolt failed and he was forced to escape to France, while the government sentenced him to death and confiscated his properties.

During his French residence, he broadened his political and cultural horizons, thanks to contacts with renowned thinkers. He attended courses at the Sorbonne and the Collège de France, studied French and English literature and pursued a brilliant career as a journalist, becoming known and appreciated in Europe. Nicknamed, nicely, Pierre L'Oiseau de la Petite Chatte (French translation of his surname), he entered the world of French journalism thanks to Jules Simon and Daniele Manin, who appreciated the intervention of Mondo vecchio e mondo nuovo in favour of the Republic of San Marco.

War correspondent
Petruccelli became correspondent of French and Belgian journals such as La Presse, Journal des débats, Revue de Paris, Le Courrier français and Indépendance Belge. In 1851, he fought with the French republicans against the coup d'état of Louis-Napoléon Bonaparte (later known as Napoleon III) but, after the failure of the rebellion, he was expelled from France. He settled in England, where he met Giuseppe Mazzini, Louis Blanc, Lajos Kossuth and other refugees. He worked for The Daily News of Charles Dickens and other newspapers like The Daily Telegraph and Cornhill Magazine. Petrucelli was a Freemason who held speeches at the Italian Chamber of Deputies against the Roman Catholic Church, Pope Pius IX and his temporal power.

In 1859, he was correspondent of the Second Italian War of Independence and, in 1860, of the Expedition of the Thousand, following Giuseppe Garibaldi from Calabria until his entry in Naples. With the birth of the Kingdom of Italy, he was a member of the Italian parliament, sitting on the benches of the left for several years, and contributed to Italian newspapers and magazines such as L'Unione, L'Opinione, Fanfulla della Domenica, Cronaca bizantina and Nuova antologia.

In 1866, Petruccelli was correspondent for the Journal des Débats during the Third Italian War of Independence and, in 1868, he married an English writer, Maude Paley-Baronet, whom he met in London in 1867. In 1870 he followed the Franco-Prussian War, recounting the events from the Parisian barricades and, after the fall of the Paris Commune, he was expelled from France by order of Adolphe Thiers (against which he turned bitter words) for having defended the Communards.

Death
He lived the rest of his life plagued by a paralysis that prevented him from writing but, with the help of his wife, he was able to continue his activity. Petruccelli died in Paris in 1890 and his corpse was cremated. The Neapolitan municipality proposed to carry his ashes to the cemetery of Poggioreale but his wife refused and they were buried in London, respecting the will of Petruccelli.

Legacy
During his time, Ferdinando Petruccelli della Gattina wasn't much appreciated in Italy, rather he was rejected by many (especially the clerical hierarchies because of his marked anticlericalism), with the exception of authors such as Salvatore Di Giacomo and Luigi Capuana. He was acclaimed in foreign countries, especially in France, where his work received positive reviews from Alphonse Peyrat, Ernest Renan and Jules Claretie, who said about his war correspondence of Custoza : "Nothing could be more fantastic and cruelly true than this tableau of agony. Reportage has never given a superior artwork", while Justin McCarthy regarded him as "a brilliant, audacious, eccentric Italian journalist". In the 20th century, Petruccelli was praised by Luigi Russo and Indro Montanelli, who considered him the "most brilliant italian journalist of the 19th century" and his reports "would enchant for their freshness and modernity".

Notable works
La rivoluzione di Napoli del 1848 (1850)
Rome and the papacy (1859)
I moribondi del Palazzo Carignano (1862)
Pie IX, sa vie, son règne, l'homme, le prince, le pape (1866)
Memoirs of Judas (1867)
Il sorbetto della regina (1875)
I suicidi di Parigi (1878)
Memorie del colpo di stato del 1851 a Parigi (1880)

References

Bibliography
Emilio Giordano, Ferdinando Petruccelli della Gattina, Edisud, 1987

External links
 
 

1815 births
1890 deaths
People from the Province of Potenza
Italian revolutionaries
People of the Revolutions of 1848
People sentenced to death in absentia
Politicians of the Kingdom of the Two Sicilies
Italian people of the Italian unification
Italian war correspondents
Italian expatriates in France
19th-century Italian journalists
Male journalists
19th-century Italian novelists
Male novelists
19th-century male writers
19th-century Italian politicians
Italian Freemasons